This is a list of the first women lawyer(s) and judge(s) in North Dakota. It includes the year in which the women were admitted to practice law (in parentheses). Also included are women who achieved other distinctions such becoming the first in their state to graduate from law school or become a political figure.

Firsts in North Dakota's history

Lawyers 

First female: Helen Hamilton (c. 1925) 
First female to argue before the North Dakota Supreme Court: Mildred Johnson (1939)

State judges 

 First female (tribal judge for the Lakota on the Pine Ridge Reservation): Rose K. Ecoffey during the 1940s  
 First female (North Dakota Supreme Court): Beryl J. Levine (1974) in 1985  
 First female (district court): Cynthia A. Rothe-Seeger (1975) in 1988  
 First female (Southwest Judicial District): Rhonda Ehlis in 2015  
 First female (Southeast Judicial District): Cherie Clark in 2017

Federal judges 
 First female (bankruptcy court): Shon Hastings in 2011

Attorney General for North Dakota 

 First female: Heidi Heitkamp (1980) from 1993-2000

Political Office 

First female (U.S. Senate): Heidi Heitkamp (1980) in 2013

State Bar Association of North Dakota 

 First female president: Rebecca Thiem in 1996

Firsts in local history

 Rhonda Ehlis: First female appointed as a Judge of the Southwest Judicial District in North Dakota (2015) [Adams, Billings, Bowman, Dunn, Golden Valley, Hettinger, Slope and Stark Counties, North Dakota]
 Cherie Clark: First female judge appointed to the Southeast Judicial District [Barnes, Dickey, Eddy, Foster, Griggs, Kidder, LaMoure, Logan, McIntosh, Ransom, Richland, Sargent, Stutsman and Wells Counties]
 Cynthia A. Rothe-Seeger (1975): First female appointed as a Judge of the East Central Judicial District in North Dakota (1988) [Cass, Steele and Traill Counties, North Dakota]
 Beryl J. Levine (1974): First female to serve as the President of the Cass County Bar Association, North Dakota (1984)
 Haley Wamstad: First female elected as the state's attorney in Grand Forks County, North Dakota (2018)
 Robin A. Schmidt: First female district judge in McKenzie County, North Dakota (2013)
 Kirsten Sjue (2006): First female judge in Williams County, North Dakota (2015)

See also  

 List of first women lawyers and judges in the United States
 Timeline of women lawyers in the United States
 Women in law

Other topics of interest 

 List of first minority male lawyers and judges in the United States
 List of first minority male lawyers and judges in North Dakota

References 

Lawyers, North Dakota, first
North Dakota, first
Women, North Dakota, first
Women, North Dakota, first
Women in North Dakota
Lists of people from North Dakota
North Dakota lawyers